Crossocerus nigritus is a Palearctic species of solitary wasp.

References

External links
 Images representing Crossocerus nigritus

Hymenoptera of Europe
Crabronidae
Insects described in 1835
Taxa named by Amédée Louis Michel le Peletier
Taxa named by Gaspard Auguste Brullé